TEMS, tems, or variation, may stand for:  

Tactical EMS, a type of emergency service
Telecom Equipment Manufacturers
TEst Mobile System, a diagnostics suite
Timothy Edwards Middle School,  South Windsor, Connecticut, United States
Toyota Electronic Modulated Suspension
Toronto EMS, the emergency medical services provider for the city of Toronto
 Transanal Endoscopic Mucosal Surgery, an endoscopic surgery method to remove rectal polyps

See also

 
 
 
Tems (born 1995), Nigerian singer
 Tem (disambiguation)